Novomoskovskis a city and municipality in the Dnipropetrovsk Oblast (province) of Ukraine and the administrative center of Novomoskovsk Raion (district). As of January 2022 Novomoskovsk's population was approximately 

Novomoskovsk is located predominantly on the right bank of Samara River, which is one of the left confluents of Dnieper River. The city is located 27 kilometres from the oblast capital, Dnipro.

The city is famous for the Holy-Trinity Cathedral, built in 1778 by Yakym Pohrybniak from wood without any nails.

In the past it was also known as Samara.

Until 18 July 2020, Novomoskovsk was incorporated as a city of oblast significance and served as the administrative center of Novomoskovsk Raion though it did not belong to the raion. In July 2020, as part of the administrative reform of Ukraine, which reduced the number of raions of Dnipropetrovsk Oblast to seven, the city of Novomoskovsk was merged into Novomoskovsk Raion.

Gallery

See also
 Samar, Dnipro

References

External links

 Official city website

 
Novomoskovsky Uyezd
Cities of regional significance in Ukraine
Holocaust locations in Ukraine
Cities in Dnipropetrovsk Oblast